Simeon Woods Richardson (born September 27, 2000) is an American professional baseball pitcher for the Minnesota Twins of Major League Baseball (MLB). He played for the United States national baseball team in the 2020 Summer Olympics.

Amateur career
Woods Richardson attended Kempner High School in Sugar Land, Texas. He committed to attend the University of Texas at Austin to play college baseball. The New York Mets selected Woods Richardson with the 48th overall selection of the 2018 Major League Baseball draft.

Professional career

New York Mets
Woods Richardson was assigned to the Rookie-level Gulf Coast League Mets, and later promoted to the Rookie Advanced Kingsport Mets, and posted a 1–0 win–loss record, 1.56 earned run average (ERA), and 26 strikeouts in 17 innings pitched. He began the 2019 season with the Class-A Columbia Fireflies of the South Atlantic League. He was promoted to the Advanced-A St. Lucie Mets of the Florida State League (FSL) in July 2019.

Toronto Blue Jays
Before Woods Richardson could report to St. Lucie, the Mets traded him and Anthony Kay to the Blue Jays for Marcus Stroman. The Blue Jays assigned Woods Richardson to the Advanced-A Dunedin Blue Jays following the trade. Over 26 starts between Columbia and Dunedin, Woods Richardson pitched to a 6–10 record, 3.80 ERA, and 126 strikeouts in 106 innings. He opened the 2021 season with the New Hampshire Fisher Cats of the Double-A Northeast.

Minnesota Twins
On July 30, 2021, Woods Richardson was traded to the Minnesota Twins along with Austin Martin in exchange for José Berríos. He was assigned to the Wichita Wind Surge of the Double-A Central. Over 15 games (14 starts) between the two teams, he went 3–5 with a 5.91 ERA, 77 strikeouts, and 34 walks over 53 innings. He opened the 2022 season back with Wichita, and the Twins promoted Woods Richardson to the St. Paul Saints of the Triple-A International League in August.

Woods Richardson made his MLB debut for the Twins on October 2, 2022.

Woods Richardson was optioned to Triple-A St. Paul to begin the 2023 season.

International career
In May 2021, Woods Richardson was named to the roster of the United States national baseball team for qualifying for baseball at the 2020 Summer Olympics. After the team qualified, he was named to the Olympics roster on July 2. The team went on to win silver, falling to Japan in the gold-medal game.

References

External links

2000 births
Living people
African-American baseball players
Baseball players at the 2020 Summer Olympics
Baseball players from Texas
Columbia Fireflies players
Dunedin Blue Jays players
Gulf Coast Mets players
Kingsport Mets players
Major League Baseball pitchers
Medalists at the 2020 Summer Olympics
Minnesota Twins players
New Hampshire Fisher Cats players
Olympic baseball players of the United States
Olympic silver medalists for the United States in baseball
People from Sugar Land, Texas
St. Paul Saints players
United States national baseball team players
Wichita Wind Surge players
20th-century African-American sportspeople
21st-century African-American sportspeople